The Bengal cat is a domesticated cat breed created from a hybrid of the Asian leopard cat (Prionailurus bengalensis), with domestic cats, especially the spotted Egyptian Mau. It is then usually bred with a breed that has a more friendly personality, because after breeding a cat with a wildcat, its friendly personality may not be there in the kitten. The breed name comes from the leopard cat's taxonomic name.

Bengals have a wild appearance; their golden shimmer comes from their leopard cat ancestry, and their coats may show spots, rosettes, arrowhead markings, or marbling. They are an energetic breed that needs much exercise and play.

History

Early history
The earliest mention of an Asian leopard cat × domestic cross was in 1889, when Harrison Weir wrote of them in Our Cats and All About Them.

Bengals as a breed

Jean Mill of California is given credit for the modern Bengal breed. She made the first known deliberate cross of an Asian leopard cat with a domestic cat (a black California tomcat). Bengals as a breed did not really begin in earnest until much later. In 1970, Mill resumed her breeding efforts and in 1975 she received a group of Bengal cats that had been bred for use in genetic testing at Loma Linda University by Willard Centerwall. Others also began breeding Bengals.

Cat registries
In 1983, the breed was officially accepted by The International Cat Association (TICA). Bengals gained championship status in 1991.

In 1997 The Governing Council of the Cat Fancy (GCCF) accepted Bengal cats.

In 1999 Fédération Internationale Féline (FIFe) accepted Bengal cats into their registry.

The Cat Fanciers' Association (CFA) was one of the last organizations to accept the Bengal cat into their registry. "The CFA board accepted the Bengal as Miscellaneous at the February 7, 2016 board meeting. In order for a Bengal cat to be registered with the CFA it must be F6 or later (6 generations removed from the Asian Leopard Cat or non-Bengal domestic cat ancestors)."

In 1999 The Australian Cat Federation (ACF) accepted the Bengal cat into their registry.

Early generation Bengal cat
Bengal cats from the first three filial generations of breeding (F1–G3) are considered "foundation cats" or "Early Generation" Bengals. The Early generation (F1–G3) males are frequently infertile. Therefore, female early generation Bengals of the F1, G2, and G3 are bred to fertile domestic Bengals. Nevertheless, as the term was used incorrectly for many years, many people and breeders still refer to the cats as F2, F3 and F4 even though the term is considered incorrect.

Popularity
The Bengal breed was more fully developed by the 1980s. "In 1992 The International Cat Association had 125 registered Bengal Breeders." By the 2000s, Bengals had become a very popular breed.  In 2019, there were nearly 2,000 Bengal breeders worldwide.

* The 2019 number only represents the breeders who use the word "Bengals" in their cattery name.

Appearance

Markings

Colors
Bengals come in a variety of coat colors. The International Cat Association (TICA) recognizes several Bengal colors. Brown Spotted, Seal Lynx Point (snow), Sepia, silver, and Mink Spotted Tabby Bengals.

Spotted Rosetted

The Bengal cat is the only domestic breed of cat that has rosette markings.

People most often associate the Bengal with the most popular color: the Brown spotted/rosetted Bengal. Nonetheless, Bengals have a wide variety of markings and colors. Even within the Brown spotted/rosetted category a Bengal can be: red, brown, black, ticked, grey, spotted, rosetted, clouded. Many people are stunned by the Bengal Cat's resemblance to a leopard. Among domestic cats, the Bengal markings are perhaps the most varied and unique.

A Bengal cat with a large rosetted coat and a high contrast in coloring is referred to as a "clouded bengal".

Marble

Domestic cats have four distinct and heritable coat patterns – ticked, mackerel, blotched, and spotted – these are collectively referred to as tabby markings.

Christopher Kaelin, a Stanford University geneticist, has conducted research that has been used to identify the spotted gene and the marble gene in domestic Bengal cats.  Kaelin studied the color and pattern variations of feral cats in Northern California, and was able to identify the gene responsible for the marble pattern in Bengal cats.

Bengal size
The Bengal is an average to large-sized, spotted cat breed. Bengals are long and lean. Bengals are larger than the average house cat because of their muscular bodies. Breeders in recent years have begun selective breeding to breed a Bengal cat closer in size to the original Asian leopard cat. The size of cashmere Bengal cats ranges from medium to giant, with males often being larger than females

Legal restrictions
In the United States, legal restrictions may be in place in cities and states. In New York City and the state of Hawaii, Bengal cats are prohibited by law (as are all wild cat species, and all other hybrids of domestic and wild cats). In various other places, such as Seattle, Washington, and Denver, Colorado, there are limits on Bengal ownership. Bengals of the F1-G4 generations are regulated in New York, Georgia, Massachusetts, Delaware, Connecticut, and Indiana. Except where noted above, Bengal cats with a generation of G5 and beyond are considered domestic, and are generally legal. In Alaska, Bengal cats must be four generations removed from the Asian Leopard cat. A permit and registered pedigree that indicates the previous four generations are required. In California, the code of regulations Title 14, section K, Asian leopards are not specifically listed as a restricted species. In Connecticut, it is illegal to own any generation of Bengal cat. In Delaware, a permit is required to own Bengal cats.

Bengals were regulated in the United Kingdom. In 2007, however, the Department for Environment, Food and Rural Affairs removed the previous licensing requirements.

In Australia G5 Bengals are not restricted, but their import is complex.

Temperament
Bengal cats are smart, energetic and playful (though in some rare cases they may be quite lazy). Many Bengal owners say that their Bengal naturally retrieves items, and they often enjoy playing in water.

Health

Hypertrophic cardiomyopathy (HCM)

Hypertrophic cardiomyopathy (HCM) is a major concern in the Bengal cat breed. This is a disease in which the heart muscle (myocardium) becomes abnormally thick (hypertrophied). A thick heart muscle can make it harder for the cat's heart to pump blood. The only way to determine the suitability of Bengal cats meant for breeding is to have the cat's heart scanned by a cardiologist.

HCM is a common genetic disease in Bengal cats and there is no genetic testing available as of 2018. In the United States, the current practice of screening for HCM involves bringing Bengal cats to a board certified veterinary cardiologist where an echocardiogram is completed. Bengal cats that are used for breeding should be screened annually to ensure that no hypertrophic cardiomyopathy is present. Currently North Carolina State University is attempting to identify genetic markers for HCM in the Bengal Cat.

One study published in the Journal of Internal Veterinary Medicine has claimed the prevalence of hypertrophic cardiomyopathy in Bengal cats is 16.7% (95% CI = 13.2–46.5%).

Bengal progressive retinal atrophy (PRA-b)
Bengal cats are known to be affected by several genetic diseases, one of which is Bengal progressive retinal atrophy, also known as Bengal PRA or PRA-b. Anyone breeding Bengal cats should carry out this test, since it is inexpensive, noninvasive, and easy to perform. A breeder stating their cats are "veterinarian tested" should not be taken to mean that this test has been performed by a vet: it is carried out by the breeder, outside of a vet office (rarely, if ever, by a vet). The test is then sent directly to the laboratory.

Erythrocyte pyruvate kinase deficiency (PK-deficiency or PK-def)
PK deficiency is a common genetic diseases found in Bengal Cats. PK deficiency is another test that is administered by the breeder. Breeding Bengal Cats should be tested before breeding to ensure two PK deficiency carriers are not mated. This is a test that a breeder must do on their own. A breeder uses a cotton swab to rub the inside of the cat's mouth and then mails the swab to the laboratory.

Bengal blood type
The UC Davis Veterinary Genetics Laboratory has studied domestic cat blood types. They conclude that most domestic cats fall within the AB system. The common blood types are A and B and some cats have the rare AB blood type. There is a lack of sufficient samples from Bengals, so the genetics of the AB blood group in Bengal cats is not well understood.

One Bengal blood type study that took place in the U.K. tested 100 Bengal cats. They concluded that all 100 of the Bengal cats tested had type A blood.

Shedding and grooming
Bengals are often claimed by breeders and pet adoption agencies to be a hypoallergenic breed – one less likely to cause an allergic reaction.  The Bengal cat is said to produce lower than average levels of allergens, though this has not been scientifically proven as of 2020.

Cat geneticist Leslie Lyons, who runs the University of Missouri's Feline and Comparative Genetics Laboratory, discounts such claims, observing that there is no such thing as a hypoallergenic cat. Alleged hypoallergenic breeds thus may still produce a reaction among those who have severe allergies.

Bengal Longhair (Cashmere Bengal)

Some long-haired Bengals (more properly, semi-long-haired) have always occurred in Bengal breeding. Many different domestic cats were used to create the Bengal breed, and it is theorized that the gene for long hair came from one of these backcrossings. UC Davis has developed a genetic test for long hair so that Bengal breeders could select Bengal cats with a recessive long-hair gene for their breeding programs.

Some Bengal cats used in breeding can carry a recessive gene for long-haired. When a male and female Bengal each carry a copy of the recessive long hair gene, and those two Bengals are mated with each other, they can produce long-haired Bengals. (See Cat coat genetics#Genes involved in fur length and texture.) In the past, long-haired offspring of Bengal matings were spayed or neutered until some breeders chose to develop the long-haired Bengal (which are sometimes called a Cashmere Bengal)

Long-haired Bengals are starting to gain more recognition in some cat breed registries but are not widely accepted. Since 2013, they have "preliminary" breed status in the New Zealand Cat Fancy (NZCF) registry, under the breed name Cashmere Bengal.  Since 2017 The International Cat Association (TICA) has accepted the Bengal Longhair in competitions.

See also
List of cat breeds
List of cat registries

References

Information about bengal cat ISNN 2792-5447

External links
 Complete Bengal Cat History 
 Bengal Cat Guide
 Bengal Genetics
 Silver Bengal Cat

Cat breeds
Cat breeds originating in the United States
Domestic–wild hybrid cats
Intergeneric hybrids